Abhishek Mahananda is an Indian politician from the Indian National Congress and is currently serving as the Odisha Pradesh Congress Committee Social Media Chairman.

Personal life
Abhishek Mahananda is son of Bijay & Ashima Mahananda. His mother Ashima was a senior woman politician of Odisha & a senior member of the All India Mahila Congress who believed in the ideology of social liberalism, secularism propagated by the Indian National Congress. She also served as a member in the State Commission for Women . Abhishek Mahananda is the grandson of Late Achyutananda Mahananda, a former Cabinet Minister & five times MLA in the Odisha Legislative Assembly. Abhishek's maternal grand father Dr.Harekrushna Mallick was a Rajya Sabha MP. Dr Mallick was a gold medalist in medicine and a practicing doctor.Abhishek Mahananda completed his post graduation in 2006. He is also an accomplished snooker & billiards player having competed in national championships across India. He is also a former Cricketer who played as a medium fast bowler and middle order batsman in the Junior State under-16 category. Abhishek was trained at Saheed Sporting Club under coach Kamal Ganguly where he played along with International Players like Debashish Mohanty and Pragyan Ojha.  

He also is a businessman who has interests in the food & beverages sector & also in digital media advertising.

Political life
Mahananda had contested from Cuttack Sadar (Vidhan Sabha constituency) and lost the election. In April  2019, he contested the election to the Odisha Legislative Assembly from Cuttack Sadar (Vidhan Sabha constituency) on an Odisha Congress ticket and gained 6,229 of 155,799 votes cast.

References

Odisha politicians
Living people
Indian National Congress politicians
Year of birth missing (living people)
Indian National Congress politicians from Odisha